Małgorzata "Malgosia" Majewska (born February 23, 1981, Gdańsk, Poland) is a Polish-Canadian model and beauty pageant titleholder who won Miss World Canada 2006 and Miss World Peel Region 2006. During the Miss World Canada competition, she won the Miss Fitness component which placed her among the finalists.

Ms. Majewska, a Pole emigrated to Canada, is a graduate of Temple University (Philadelphia, USA) with an Honors Degree in International Business and Economics.  She attended the university on a full volleyball scholarship and completed two study-abroad terms in Rome, Italy.  She speaks her native Polish, English, French and Italian.

She placed in the top 25 for the Miss World Beach Beauty award, the first of the fast track events.  On September 12, 2006, Malgosia won the Miss World Sports competition, which gave her a fast track to the semifinals.  In the talent competition, she placed in the top 20.  On September 30, 2006, she competed in the Miss World finals in Warsaw, Poland.

She attended Mayfield Secondary School in Caledon, Ontario, from 1995 to 2000.

Placements at Miss World 2006
MAIN CONTEST: Top 17 semifinalist

Fast Track Competitions:
Miss Sport: Winner
Beach Beauty: Top 25 semifinalist
Miss Talent: Top 20 semifinalist

Miss World Canada 2006 Results

Miss World Canada 2006: Malgosia Majewska, Miss Peel Region

References
Miss World Canada Official Site
Miss World Official Site
MalgosiaMajewska.com

1981 births
Living people
Miss World 2006 delegates
Miss World Canada winners
People from Caledon, Ontario
Polish emigrants to Canada
Fox School of Business and Management alumni
People from Gdańsk